After the Second World War a number of social security reforms were carried out in Italian domestic policy.

Social security reforms under Alcide De Gasperi
Various ministers of Prime Minister Alcide De Gasperi cabinets from December 1945 until August 1953: 

A law of 27 February 1947 implemented the first post-war regulation of rents, with all rents of economic/popular housing frozen and subject to state control; with minor changes, regulations were effective until a Fair Rent Law of 1978.
A law of 28 February 1949 launched a seven-year plan for popular housing to increase the stock of economic housing by means of construction or purchase of economic accommodation. The law also established a special housing fund (INA-Casa) within the National Institute for Insurance (Istituto Nazionale delle Assicurazioni, or INA).
A law of 29 July 1947 established a Fund For Social Solidarity within INPS in order to pay graduated supplementary allowances to all pensions, compensating for inflation.
A law of 29 April 1949 introduced new provisions for unemployment insurance and labour policy. A Central Commission for Work Training and Assistance for the Unemployed was set up with the task of monitoring the state of the labour market and the conditions of the unemployed, while regulations concerning the replacement of the unemployed into the labour market (collocamento) were introduced. Provincial offices for Labour and Full Employment were also established, with local sections, which organized waiting lists, training courses, and the allocation of available jobs, amongst other services. Unemployment indemnity was increased to Lit. 200 per day (approximately 17% of the average gross industrial wage for 1949) and its duration was extended from 120 t 180 days. Unemployment insurance was extended to agricultural workers, and a special unemployment benefit (sussidio straordinario di disoccupazione) was introduced, paid under exceptional circumstances; flat-rate benefit with ad hoc determined level for 90 to 180 days. Vocational training and professional requalification programmes for the unemployed were also introduced, along with a Fund for Professional Training of Workers.
A law of 28 July 1950 extended compulsory pension insurance to employees earning over Lit. 1,500 per month or approximately 6% of the average gross industrial wage for 1950 (previously, social insurance was compulsory only for employees earning less than this amount).
A law of July 1949 introduced broad tax exemptions and increased state subsidies for the construction of economic housing.
A law of 10 August 1950 established a fund for the increase of housing stock, known as the “Fondo per l’Incremento Edilizio, which grants cheap loans to private builders.
A law of 12 August 1947 extended earnings replacement benefits to cover temporary unemployment.
A law of 29 April 1949 introduced new provisions for unemployment insurance and labour policy. A Central Commission for Work Training and Assistance for the Unemployed was established with the task of monitoring the state of the labour market and the conditions of the unemployed.
A law of 15 November 1952 increased the number of occupational diseases for which insurance benefits were payable.
A law of 8 July 1952 introduced “aggiunte di famiglia, a monthly flat-rate sum for all categories of state employees.
A law of 23 March 1948 established the National Institute For Assistance Of The Orphans Of Italian Workers.
A law of 23 March 1948 established the National Institute For Italian Pensioners, providing benefits and services for needy pensioners.
A law of 9 January 1946 reorganized the health insurance system for sharecroppers, tenant farmers, and agricultural workers, with a flat-rate daily indemnity of Lit.28 for women and Lit.60 for men (i.e. 3% and 7% of the average gross industrial wage for 1947) for a maximum of 180 days a year and free medical and hospital assistance provided through INAM.
A law of 19 April 1946 reorganized the health insurance system for industrial employees, with a daily sickness indemnity equal to 50% of earnings, for a maximum of 180 days a year, a flat-rate maternity indemnity equal to a lump sum of Lit.1000 for 120 days (1% of average gross for industrial wage in 1947), a funeral allowance and free medical, hospital, and pharmaceutical assistance through INAM.
A law of 31 October 1947 reorganized the health insurance system for service employees (e.g. banking and commerce), with a daily sickness indemnity equal to 50% of earnings for a maximum of 180 days a year, a flat-rate maternity payment, funeral allowance, and free hospital, medical, and pharmaceutical assistance through INAM.
A law of 12 February 1948 reorganized the health insurance system for state employees, with the introduction of a daily sickness indemnity equal to 50% of earnings for a maximum of 180 days and free hospital, medical, and pharmaceutical assistance.
A law of 26 August 1950 introduced various regulations covering maternity insurance for all female employees. These included:

(1.) Daily indemnity equal to 80% of earnings (for agriculture: flat-rate sum ranging from Lit.12,000 to Lit.25,000, i.e. 15%-32% of average gross industrial wage for 1950).
(2.) A period of leave, starting 3 months (industry), 8 weeks (agriculture), 6 weeks (others) prior to confinement and ending 8 weeks after it.
(3.) Exemption from heavy, unhealthy or dangerous work.
(4.) Job security, throughout the period of pregnancy and until the child is a year old.

Social security reforms under Amintore Fanfani
During various terms of Prime Minister Amintore Fanfani, a number of reforms in areas such as health, education, and social security were carried out. 

A law of 14 February 1962 established an agency called the Workers’ Housing Fund, with a ten-year plan for the overall coordination of economic housing.
A law of 18 April 1962 introduced broad provisions covering building areas. Local government was obliged to provide plans of areas suitable for economic housing, while strict price controls for building areas were introduced to prevent speculation.
A law of 31 December 1962 extended compulsory education to the age of 14, introduced a single unified curriculum (scuola media unificata) lasting for a 3-year period after primary education.
A law of 12 August 1962 introduced a supplementary pension payment, equal to one-twelfth of the annual amount of pension minima, while also introducing child supplements for pensioners.
A law of 5 March 1963 introduced a voluntary pension insurance scheme for housewives.
A law of 19 January 1963 extended the insurance against occupational diseases to artisans, while general improvements to cash benefits were carried out: all pensions (rendite) were to be adjusted every third year to the minimum contractual wage in the respective industrial sector, while earnings-replacement rates were raised to correspond to contractual disability rates.
A law of 3 February 1963 established a special fund for earnings replacement benefits within CIGI for the construction industry.
A law of 27 November 1960 extended health insurance to self-employed traders, and established a special mutual aid fund as for farmers and artisans.
A law of 26 February 1963 improved health benefits for agricultural workers, with the introduction of free pharmaceutical assistance and the flat-rate sickness indemnity replaced by an earnings-related indemnity equal to 50% of minimum contractual pay (in each province) for a maximum of 180 days.
A law of 26 February 1963 extended health insurance to retired artisans.
A law of 25 March 1983 introduced special family supplements for lower-income employees and pensioners.

References

History of the Italian Republic